Sherbrooke Street (officially in ) is a major east–west artery and at  in length, is the second longest street on the Island of Montreal.  The street begins in the town of Montreal West and ends on the extreme tip of the island in Pointe-aux-Trembles, intersecting Gouin Boulevard and joining up with Notre-Dame Street. East of Cavendish Boulevard this road is part of Quebec Route 138.

The street is divided into two portions. Sherbrooke Street East is located east of Saint Laurent Boulevard and Sherbrooke Street West is located west.  Sherbrooke Street West is home to many historic mansions that comprised its exclusive Golden Square Mile district, including the now-demolished Van Horne Mansion, the imposing Beaux-Arts style Montreal Masonic Memorial Temple as well as several historic properties incorporated into Maison Alcan, the world headquarters for Alcan.

Sherbrooke Street East runs along the edge (both administrative and topographic) of the Plateau Mont-Royal, at the top of a marked hillside known as Côte à Baron, and continues between the Jardin Botanique de Montréal and Parc Maisonneuve to the north and Parc Olympique to the south. The street is named for John Coape Sherbrooke, the Governor General of British North America from 1816 to 1818.

A separate street of the same name exists in Lachine; it does not carry the "West" suffix and repeats numbers that are used on the longer Sherbrooke Street.

History

In 1817, Sherbrooke Street initially consisted of two sections, from de Bleury Street to Sanguinet Street. Its relative remoteness from "downtown" (at the time; now Old Montreal) made it difficult to establish industries or factories. Many nursing homes and educational institutions were established on the street in the 19th century, such as McGill University, the École normale Jacques-Cartier, the Collège Mont-Saint-Louis, and the Couvent du Bon Pasteur.

From the early 20th century to the 1930s, Sherbrooke Street was the most prestigious street in Montreal. In 1912, the Montreal Museum of Fine Arts was established on Sherbrooke Street West. Later, with the expansion of the city centre, luxurious new houses were built a little farther west in the new Garden City of Westmount.

Sherbrooke Street was extended eastward from the early 20th century and followed the urban development of Montreal eastward. It was central to the creation of several institutions and parks such as La Fontaine Park, the Notre-Dame Hospital, Maisonneuve Park, Montreal Botanical Garden and Olympic Stadium.

In 1976, the street was to be venue for an 8 km exhibit of art entitled Corridart during the 1976 Summer Olympics. However, in a controversial decision, former Mayor Jean Drapeau had the exhibition torn down two days before the Games began.

Educational institutions
Three of Montreal's four major universities are on Sherbrooke Street. Downtown is the main campus of McGill University, and farther west is the Loyola Campus of Concordia University. The street also has UQAM's Complexe des sciences Pierre-Dansereau and INRS's Montréal campus as well as Dawson College, Collège de Maisonneuve CEGEPs, and the Collège de Montréal.

Attractions
Other key attractions on the street include the Montreal Museum of Fine Arts, Grand Séminaire de Montréal, McCord Museum, Ritz-Carlton Montreal, Holt Renfrew, Parc Lafontaine, and further east, the Château Dufresne, Olympic Stadium, Montreal Botanical Garden and the Montreal Biodome.

Image gallery

References

External links
 Heritage Montreal description

Streets in Montreal
Montreal West, Quebec
Côte-des-Neiges–Notre-Dame-de-Grâce
Westmount, Quebec
Downtown Montreal
Le Plateau-Mont-Royal
Rosemont–La Petite-Patrie
Mercier–Hochelaga-Maisonneuve
Montréal-Est, Quebec
Rivière-des-Prairies–Pointe-aux-Trembles
Shopping districts and streets in Canada